Ciao, ciao bambina! is a 1959 Italian comedy film directed by Sergio Grieco and starring Elsa Martinelli and Antonio Cifariello. It grossed 220 million lire at the Italian box office.

Cast 

 Elsa Martinelli as Diana
 Antonio Cifariello as  Riccardo Branca
 Lorella De Luca as  Gloria
 Riccardo Garrone as  Guido Branca
 Luigi Pavese as  Branca
 Elisa Cegani as  Bice
 Carlo Romano as  Remigio 
 Aroldo Tieri as Train Conductor
 Andrea Aureli as Brigadiere
 Gianni Garko 
 Gino Buzzanca
 Bruno Corelli
 Carlo Giuffrè
 Renato Malavasi
 Marco Tulli

References

External links

Italian comedy films
1959 comedy films
1959 films
Films directed by Sergio Grieco
Films scored by Piero Umiliani
Italian black-and-white films
1950s Italian films
1950s Italian-language films